The northern waterthrush (Parkesia noveboracensis) is a species of ground-feeding migratory New World warbler of the genus Parkesia. It breeds in the northern part of North America in Canada and the northern United States including Alaska, and winters in Central America, the West Indies and Florida, as well as in Venezuela, Colombia, and Ecuador.  It is a rare vagrant to other South American countries and to western Europe. Its closest relative is the Louisiana waterthrush.

Etymology

The genus name Parkesia commemorates Kenneth Carroll Parkes, American ornithologist and curator of the Carnegie Museums of Pittsburgh, and noveboracensis is New York, the type locality from Latin novus, "new" and Eboracum, York.

Description

The northern waterthrush is a large New World warbler (and not a thrush, despite the name). On the head, the crown is brown with a white supercilium. The bill is pointed and dark. The throat is lightly streaked brown to black with heavier streaking continuing onto the breast and flanks. The back is evenly brown. Sexes are morphologically similar. Young birds have buff, rather than white underparts.

The only species birdwatchers confuse with the northern waterthrush is the closely related Louisiana waterthrush (Parkesia motacilla), which has buff flanks, a buff undertail, and bright pink legs. The Louisiana waterthrush also has a whiter throat with fewer streaks. More subtle clues include smaller size and smaller bill, a narrower and darker eye-line, and different call note and habits.

Both waterthrush species walk rather than hop, and seem to teeter, since they bob their rear ends as they move along.

Behavior
The roosts are often located in red mangrove habitats. Northern waterthrushes winter in 4 main habitats in Puerto Rico: white mangrove, red mangrove, black mangrove, and scrub. Males, which are larger and migrate earlier in spring, prefer to winter in white mangrove, and are able to maintain or gain weight through the winter. Females winter in the other drier and less food-rich habitats. During the non-breeding period, northern waterthrushes are site-faithful and tend to be solitary.

Waterthrushes wintering in red and black mangrove can maintain body weight through the winter but lose weight in scrub. Another determinant in body mass increase in the wintering grounds is moisture.

Northern waterthrush territories are distributed across both upland and riparian habitats, but have limited occupation of harvested areas. Crowding into riparian buffer zones adjacent to harvested areas have more difficulty foraging compared to those in untouched areas.

Reproduction
The breeding habitat of the northern waterthrush is wet woodlands near water. It nests in a stump or among tree roots where it lays three to six eggs, cream- or buff-colored, with brown and gray spots. These eggs are laid in a cup nest constructed of leaves, bark strips, and rootlets.

Diet
The northern waterthrush is a terrestrial ground feeder, eating insects, spiders, mollusks (such as snails), worms, and crustaceans found amongst leaf litter, as well as minnows, found by wading through water.

Vocalization
The song of loud, emphatic, clear chirping notes generally falling in pitch and accelerating; loosely paired or tripled, with little variation. Call a loud, hard spwik rising with a strong K sound. The flight call is a buzzy, high, slightly rising zzip.

Vagrancy 
The first northern waterthrush recorded in Europe was a female trapped in Ushant, France on 17 September 1955. The species was first recorded in the United Kingdom on 30 September 1958, on St. Agnes, Isles of Scilly. It was caught in a mist-net, photographed, and released, after which it stayed until 12 October. There have been seven records in the UK between 1958 and 2019.

Gallery

References

External links

Smithsonian Migratory Bird Center - Northern waterthrush research
Northern waterthrush - Seiurus noveboracensis - USGS Patuxent Bird Identification InfoCenter
Northern waterthrush species account – Cornell Lab of Ornithology
 
 

northern waterthrush
Birds of North America
Native birds of Alaska
Birds of Canada
Birds of the Dominican Republic
northern waterthrush
Taxa named by Johann Friedrich Gmelin